Diego Martínez Penas (born 16 December 1980) is a Spanish football coach and former player who manages RCD Espanyol.

After starting his career in the lower divisions, he held several jobs at Sevilla, including as assistant and reserve team manager. He later managed Osasuna and Granada, achieving promotion to La Liga with the latter.

Playing career
Born in Vigo, Pontevedra, Galicia, Martínez was a full back capable of playing on either side. He spent his youth career at Celta de Vigo and Cádiz CF, representing the former for nine years.

Coaching career

Early career
Martínez retired from professional football at the age of 20, and started his coaching career with CD Imperio de Albolote's youth categories, while also playing for their first team. During this time he also studied for a degree.

In 2004, he moved to Arenas CD, being initially in charge of the youth setup.

An assistant manager in the 2005–06 campaign, Martínez was appointed manager of the first team in July 2006, in Tercera División. The following year he was named Motril CF manager, and remained in charge for two years.

Sevilla
In October 2009 Martínez moved to Sevilla FC, immediately joining the backroom staff. He was in charge of the club's C-team the following season, and subsequently managed the Juvenil squad.

On 22 May 2012, Martínez was named assistant at the first team, replacing Javi Navarro. On 13 June 2014, he was appointed at the helm of the reserves in Segunda División B, and managed to achieve promotion to Segunda División in 2016.

After avoiding relegation with the reserve side, Martínez opted not to renew his contract, and was appointed in charge of CA Osasuna on 14 June 2017. The following 7 June, he left the club after failing to qualify for the play-offs.

Granada
On 14 June 2018, Martínez was named Granada CF manager, and achieved promotion to La Liga at the end of the season. The youngest manager of the 2019–20 campaign, his side enjoyed their best-ever league start after achieving 20 points in ten matches, bringing the Nazaríes to the top of the tournament for two weeks. As a result, he was rewarded with a one-year contract extension through 2021 on 14 November 2019.

Martínez was awarded with the Miguel Muñoz Trophy (shared with José Bordalás) by Marca on 16 December 2019, for his efforts in the previous campaign. With a 7th-place finish in his debut top-flight campaign, he qualified the team for the first time to the UEFA Europa League. In that campaign, they reached the quarter-finals before being eliminated by Manchester United.

On 27 May 2021, Martínez chose to allow his contract to expire. He then spent time in England, watching football matches and learning from English-based coaches including Pep Guardiola, Rafael Benitez, Frank Lampard and Xisco Munoz.

Espanyol
On 31 May 2022, Martínez was named manager of RCD Espanyol also in the top tier, on a two-year contract.

Managerial statistics

Honours

Manager

Individual 
 Miguel Muñoz Trophy: 2018–19

References

External links

1980 births
Living people
Footballers from Vigo
Spanish footballers
Association football fullbacks
Spanish football managers
La Liga managers
Segunda División managers
Segunda División B managers
Tercera División managers
Sevilla Atlético managers
CA Osasuna managers
Granada CF managers
RCD Espanyol managers
Sevilla FC non-playing staff
RC Celta de Vigo players
Cádiz CF players
CD Imperio de Albolote players